Clayton LeBouef (born November 12, 1954) is an American actor, best known for his recurring role as Colonel George Barnfather in Homicide: Life on the Street. He appeared in several episodes during each of the show's seven seasons on the air, from 1993 to 1999, and reprised his role in Homicide: The Movie, the epilogue movie, in 2000.

Background 
LeBouef was born in Yonkers, New York. He performed as a theatre actor prior to his role as Captain Barnfather. He performs spoken-word pieces in addition to having authored several plays. His play Shero: The Livication of Henrietta Vinton Davis won an honorable mention at the 25th Annual Larry Neal Writers' Competition in Washington, D.C. on May 9, 2008.

In 2000, he appeared in the award-winning miniseries The Corner. In 2002, he played Wendell "Orlando" Blocker in seven episodes of The Wire.

LeBouef appeared as Harold Thomas the brother of the main character, Vivien Thomas, in the 2004 HBO movie Something the Lord Made which starred Mos Def.

From 2003 to 2005, he appeared in three episodes of Law and Order: Criminal Intent, two as the character Detective Edmunds.

His portrayal of barbershop owner Tom Taylor in the short film The Doll won him "Best Actor" honors at the San Diego Black Film Festival.

Filmography

Film

Television

References

External links
 
 Something the Lord Made. HBO film (2004).
 The Doll

African-American male actors
American male television actors
American male stage actors
Male actors from New York (state)
People from Yonkers, New York
1954 births
Living people
20th-century American male actors
21st-century American male actors
20th-century African-American people
21st-century African-American people